Hermann Eduard von Holst (June 19, 1841 – January 20, 1904) was a German-American historian.

Biography
Holst was a Baltic German born at Fellin, Russian Empire. (It is now Viljandi, Estonia.) He was the seventh of ten children of a Lutheran minister. His father died while he was in the Gymnasium (elite secondary school), and he had to teach and live frugally to stay in school.

He studied history at the universities of University of Dorpat now (Tartu) and Heidelberg, where he received a doctorate under Ludwig Häusser in 1865. In 1866, he settled in St. Petersburg, but in consequence of a pamphlet on an attempt on the life of the emperor, which he published at Leipzig while he was traveling abroad, his return to Russia was forbidden.

He decided to emigrate to the United States in July 1867. He settled in New York City, where he taught modern languages for a time in a small private school and made a number of political speeches in the runup to the 1868 election. In the autumn of 1869, he became assistant editor, under Alexander Jacob Schem, of the Deutsch-Amerikanisches Conversations-Lexicon.

His work in German on Louis XIV, Federzeichnung aus der Geschichte des Despotismus, appeared in Leipzig soon after he arrived to the US. He subsequently became a contributor to several American journals.

On April 23, 1872 in Manhattan, he married Annie Isabelle Hatt, the daughter of the Rev. Josiah Hatt (1821–1857), pastor of the Baptist Church in Hoboken, New Jersey, and his wife, Mary Thomas. Their son Hermann V. von Holst, the future architect, was born in Freiburg im Breisgau in 1874.

A call to a professorship of history in the newly reorganized University of Strasbourg brought him back to Germany in 1872. In 1874, he was given the chair of modern history at University of Freiburg in the Grand Duchy of Baden where he stayed until 1892. For ten years, he was a member of the Baden Herrenhaus, and he was vice president for four years. He revisited the United States in 1878 and 1879 and in 1884.  In 1882 he was elected a member of the American Antiquarian Society In 1892, he became head of the department of history at the University of Chicago. Retiring on account of ill-health in 1900, he returned to Germany and died at Freiburg in January 1904.

Von Holst's works are almost all on American topics. Through his books and his lectures at the University of Chicago, he exerted a powerful influence in encouraging American students to follow more closely the German methods of historical research.

Works
Verfassung und Demokratie der Vereinigten Staaten or Constitutional and Political History of the United States (German ed., 5 vols., 1873–91; English trans. by Lalor and Mason, 8 vols., 1877–92) This is his principal work. It covers the period from 1783 to 1861, though more than half of it is devoted to the decade 1850-60. It is written from a strongly anti-slavery point of view.
Das Staatrecht der Vereinigten Staaten or The Constitutional Law of the United States of America (German ed., 1885; English trans., 1887)
John C. Calhoun (1882), in the American Statesmen Series
John Brown (1888)
The French Revolution Tested by Mirabeau's Career (1894)  The topic of this book was the subject of a series of twelve lectures he gave for the Lowell Institute's 1893-94 season.

Notes

References
 This work in turn cites:
 Obituary in Political Science Quarterly, vol. v, pp. 677-78.
 Obituary in Nation (New York), vol. lxxviii. pp. 65–67.

External links
 
 
 New York Times Obituary
 New York Times on University of Chicago appointment
 

Guide to the Hermann Eduard Von Holst Collection 1869-1902 at the University of Chicago Special Collections Research Center

1841 births
1904 deaths
People from Viljandi
People from Kreis Fellin
Baltic-German people
19th-century German historians
German politicians
German male non-fiction writers
German expatriates in the United States
University of Tartu alumni
Heidelberg University alumni
University of Chicago faculty
Academic staff of the University of Strasbourg
Academic staff of the University of Freiburg
Members of the American Antiquarian Society